Dad Khan Jarwar is a town and union council of Tando Allahyar District in the Sindh Province of Pakistan. It has a population of 65,295 and is part of Chamber Taluka located in the south of the district at 25°19'5N 68°43'20E.

dad jarwar is a Union council of Tando Allahyar District in Sindh, Pakistan. It is one of the largest Union Councils of the District, it has a population of over 13,000.

Environment
The union council has a fresh environment but unfortunately located at the tail of water distributory minors like Zanur and Miran khori. Moreover, poor provincial administration and political influential lords make available water resources meager for the common people / peasants. The people of the vicinity face huge problem of drinking water which is rarely available from water supply scheme or water treatment plants and boring water is also undrinkable.

Education
The education system is well developed with primary and elementary schools separate for boys and girls but no staff. Owing to this, students have to travel far away to nearby city, town schools for acquiring education. The literacy ratio is about 50% and improvement in this direction is still awaited .

Health
The health system is also good but needs progress.
VILLAG- ghulam Hussain in Dispensry

Administration
Mr. Nabi Bux Lund is Nazim of the union council.  The District Government is taking good decision for the progress of this union council.

Notable people

 Abdul Karim Laghari – An Alim who studied at the Darul Uloom Deoband, Deoband, India.
 Sher Muhammad Jarwar (1954 - 2020) - An advocate, social activist and former member union council who despite of limited resources and resistance from powerful lords succeeded to get basic infrastructure like roads, schools, electrification and water supply scheme.
Haji Nabi Bux Lund- Lund Brothers Sardar which is majority of the union Dad Khan Jarwar he is also the Nazim of this union he is famous person of the Union for his great administration.

See also
 Ramapir Temple Tando Allahyar

References

Union councils of Sindh
Tando Allahyar District
Populated places in Sindh